Luis Ángel "Canena" Márquez Sánchez (October 28, 1925 – March 1, 1988, Aguadilla, Puerto Rico) was a professional baseball player. He was the third Puerto Rican to play in Major League Baseball (after Hiram Bithorn and Luis Olmo). Márquez played in a total of 68 games in the major leagues, split in two seasons between the Boston Braves, the Chicago Cubs and the Pittsburgh Pirates. His final game was on July 11, 1954.

Background
He played in the Negro leagues with the New York Black Yankees, Baltimore Elite Giants and Homestead Grays. In 1949 he became the first black player to sign with the New York Yankees. He played for 20 seasons in Puerto Rico's winter league. In a history of Puerto Rican baseball, Thomas Van Hyning described Márquz as "a complete ballplayer who could hit, run, throw, play good defense and provide power when needed." He is the all-time leader in hits at the PRWL, with 1,206, runs (768) and doubles (235).

Márquez played 14 seasons in the minor leagues. He played for the Portland Beavers in the Pacific Coast League and for the Milwaukee Brewers, the Toledo Sox, and the Dallas-Fort Worth Rangers in the American Association.

Márquez was involved in baseball throughout his life as a player, coach, trainer, and Little League coach. The municipal baseball stadium in Aguadilla, Estadio Luis A. Canena Márquez, is named for him.

Márquez was murdered in Puerto Rico, as he was shot during a domestic dispute.

See also
Indios de Mayagüez

References

Bibliography

External links
 and Seamheads

1925 births
1988 deaths
Baltimore Elite Giants players
Boston Braves players
Cangrejeros de Santurce (baseball) players
Chicago Cubs players
Dallas Rangers players
Deaths by firearm in Puerto Rico
Homestead Grays players
Liga de Béisbol Profesional Roberto Clemente outfielders
Major League Baseball outfielders
Major League Baseball players from Puerto Rico
Male murder victims
Milwaukee Brewers (AA) players
New York Black Yankees players
Newark Bears players
People murdered in Puerto Rico
Petroleros de Poza Rica players
People from Aguadilla, Puerto Rico
Pittsburgh Pirates players
Portland Beavers players
Puerto Rican expatriate baseball players in Mexico
Puerto Rican murder victims
Toledo Sox players
Williamsport Grays players
1988 murders in Puerto Rico
20th-century African-American sportspeople